Express Yourself may refer to:
Express Yourself (album), a 2004 album by Erik van der Luijt
"Express Yourself" (Charles Wright & the Watts 103rd Street Rhythm Band song), 1970, from the album of the same name
"Express Yourself" (Labrinth song), 2012
"Express Yourself" (Madonna song), 1989
"Express Yourself" (N.W.A song), 1989
"Express Yourself", a song from the 2012 EP by Diplo featuring Nicky da B
 "Express Yourself", a song by Danny Brown released ahead of his 2013 album Old